"Fallen Idol" is the thirteenth and final episode of the fourth series of the British comedy series Dad's Army. It was originally transmitted on Friday 18 December 1970.

Synopsis
Mainwaring has always epitomised the principle of military sobriety to his men, but, after Captain Square leads him astray one day in the Officer's Mess, he ends up inebriated. Only something genuinely heroic now can restore his damaged reputation in the eyes of his men.

Plot
The platoon arrive at a weekend country training camp to teach them about bombs. The camp is run by a twitchy Captain Reed  (Michael Knowles) frightened by the enthusiasm and lack of awareness shown by the Home Guard. He is particularly unsettled by the Walmington-on-Sea platoon, especially Corporal Jones.

The story largely follows Captain Mainwaring's fall from grace in the eyes of his platoon, and subsequent redemption. When the men are bivouacked in a tent, he falls under the influence of Captain Square who convinces him to set up an officers only section, much to the outrage of his men. He subsequently offends them by attending a select officers mess, drinking whisky with Captain Square and colleagues, and playing "Cardinal Puff" while his men enjoy a couple of bottles of ale elsewhere. Most of the men are disgruntled, while noting this is not Mainwaring's normal behaviour. Frazer goes so far as to threaten to resign (his general surly attitude of late has led Mainwaring to suspect he is a communist, noting he "never plays Monopoly with the others" as evidence of his suspicions). A drunken Mainwaring returns to their tent only to be jumped on by Corporal Jones, thinking he is a thuggee.

The next morning, a rather hungover and worse for wear Captain Mainwaring joins his men for training. While at first things go seemingly to plan, potential disaster soon strikes when a stray grenade is fired into the roof of the platoon's van. Mainwaring immediately goes to warn Jones, who abandons the van while it is moving. A cool Mainwaring then stops and evacuates the van, but the van is stood next to power lines. Mainwaring re-enters the van and recovers the stray grenade: his command of the situation restoring his reputation in the eyes of the platoon. After Mainwaring throws the grenade away and dives for safety he hears panting, looking up to see the grenade being held by a shaggy dog. Mainwaring flees only to be chased down the road by the dog as the episode ends.

Cast

Arthur Lowe as Captain Mainwaring
John Le Mesurier as Sergeant Wilson
Clive Dunn as Lance Corporal Jones
John Laurie as Private Frazer
James Beck as Private Walker
Arnold Ridley as Private Godfrey
Ian Lavender as Private Pike
Geoffrey Lumsden as Captain Square
Rex Garner as Captain Ashley-Jones
Michael Knowles as Captain Reed
Anthony Sagar as Sergeant Major
Tom Mennard as Mess Orderly
Robert Raglan as Captain Pritchard

Notes

References

Further reading

External links

Dad's Army (series 4) episodes
1970 British television episodes